A lone wolf attack, or lone actor attack, is a particular kind of mass murder, committed in a public setting by an individual who plans and commits the act on their own. In the United States, such attacks are usually committed with firearms. In other countries, knives are sometimes used to commit mass stabbings. Although definitions vary, most databases require a minimum of four victims (including injured) for the event to be considered a mass murder.

Lone actor attacks have become the subject of academic research. Studies have found that some lone actor attacks are committed because of personal grievances and a desire for revenge, while others are acts of terrorism, intended to induce fear and influence the way people think.

The academic definition of lone actor mass shootings means they occur in a public setting and excludes the killing of multiple people if those deaths occur during the commission of other crimes, such as bank robberies or during gang warfare. The definition also excludes killings such as familicide, where the perpetrator kills the rest of their family in a private setting. Criminologist Grant Duwe identified 845 mass shootings in the United States between 1976 and 2018. However, only 158 of these met the criteria for a lone actor shooting which occurred in a public setting.

The descriptor 'lone wolf' is derived from the notion of a lone wolf, a pack animal that has left or been excluded from its pack. This particular term is more likely to be used by American law enforcement than by academics who study this phenomenon.

Definition

The term lone actor or lone wolf is not a legal term or a social science concept. It is an ill-defined and academically contested construct, manufactured by the media and by radical political actors. For academics, the definition requires that:
  the perpetrator acts alone without direction from an outside group. In some cases such as the Columbine High School massacre, two students shot and killed 12 students and one teacher. This still meets the academic definition of lone actor shooting, because the perpetrators carried out the killings without direction from anyone else 
  the shootings occurred in a public situation. Mass murders such as familicides where one member of a family kills all other members in the family home are not considered as lone actor shootings.
  the murders were not committed as part of some other criminal act such as a robbery or as part of gang conflict in which multiple individuals are shot.

Minimum number of victims 

In the United States in particular, lone actor attacks are associated with mass shootings in which multiple people are shot – although the definition of a mass shooting is also contested. Different sources describe the minimum number of victims as between three and five, with most authorities describing four as the minimum. Some sources include injured victims in the total while other definitions specify the victims must be dead in order to be counted.

Motives 
Academic studies tend to distinguish between grievance driven lone actors and lone actor terrorists.

Ideological (terrorist) 

Lone actor terrorists are ideologically driven, with political or religious  motives, and are intended to create fear and influence public opinion. Lone wolf terrorists may sympathize with and consider themselves part of larger groups, but they are usually not active participants. The links between lone wolves and actual terrorist groups tend to be informal and conducted online. These individuals tend to become radicalized online and through media outlets.

There have been cases of terrorist attacks conducted by individuals which were later found to have been directed remotely by terrorist organisations. Thus they were technically not lone wolves.

Non-ideological (grievance driven) 

Most lone actor shootings are committed by individuals with a grievance against an institution, such as their former school or workplace, with no ideological motivation. 
In the United States, the perpetrators generally use guns, whereas in other countries where the public have less access to guns (such as China), knives may be used to commit mass stabbings.

History
Historian Richard Jenson says the years 1878–1934 were the era of anarchist terrorism and should be considered the classic age of ‘‘lone wolf’’ or leaderless terrorism. Anarchists rejected authoritarian, centralized control over acts of planned violence as well as over anything else. Jenson says there were hundreds of violent anarchist incidents during this period most of which were committed by lone individuals or very small groups without command structures or leaders.

Since 1940, there have been around 100 successful lone wolf attacks in the United States. The number of attacks is increasing, however, and has grown each year since 2000. As compared to those on the far right, lone wolf attackers who become inspired by al-Qaeda and ISIS tend to be younger and better educated. According to studies, lone wolves have more in common with mass murderers than they do with members of the organized terrorist groups that often inspire them. The FBI and San Diego Police's investigation into the activities of a self-professed white supremacist, Alex Curtis, was named Operation Lone Wolf, "largely due to Curtis' encouragement of other white supremacists to follow what Curtis refers to as 'lone wolf' activism".

While the lone wolf acts to advance the ideological or philosophical beliefs of an extremist group, they act on their own, without any outside command or direction. The lone wolf's tactics and methods are conceived and directed solely on their own; in many cases, such as the tactics described by Curtis, the lone wolf never has personal contact with the group they identify with. As such, it is considerably more difficult for counter-terrorism officials to gather intelligence on lone wolves, since they may not come into contact with routine counter-terrorist surveillance.
A 2013 analysis by Sarah Teich, a research assistant at the International Institute for Counter-Terrorism, found five emerging trends in Islamist lone wolf terrorism in North America and western Europe between 1990 and 2013:
An increase in the number of countries targeted by lone wolves from the 1990s to the 2000s.
An increase in the number of people injured and killed by lone wolves.
Increased effectiveness of law enforcement and counter-terrorism.
Consistency in the distribution of attacks by "actor types" (loners, lone wolves, and lone wolf packs).
An increase in the number of attacks against military personnel.

In the United States, lone wolves may present a greater threat than organized groups.

According to the Financial Times, counter-terrorism officials refer to "lone individuals known to authorities but not considered important enough to escalate investigations" as "known wolves".

Some groups actively advocate lone wolf actions. Anti-abortion militant terrorist group the Army of God uses "leaderless resistance" as its organizing principle. According to The New York Times, in news analysis of the Boston Marathon bombing, the Al-Qaeda activist Samir Khan, publishing in Inspire, advocated individual terrorist actions directed at Americans and published detailed recipes online.

Mental health factors
Compared to the general population, lone wolf terrorists are significantly more likely to have been diagnosed with a mental illness, although it is not an accurate profiler. Studies have found that roughly a third of lone wolf terrorists have been diagnosed at some point in their life with a mental illness. This puts lone wolves as being 13.5 times more likely to suffer from a mental illness than a member of an organized terrorist group, such as al-Qaeda or ISIS. Environmental factors such as relationships with those belonging to a terrorist group, social isolation, and various stressors mediate the relationship between mental illness and lone wolf terrorism.

Mental health challenges are thought to make some individuals among the many who suffer from certain "psychological disturbances", vulnerable to being inspired by extremist ideologies to commit acts of lone wolf terrorism. An alternative explanation is that terrorist groups reject those with mental illnesses as they pose a security risk, creating a selection bias.

Forms of indirect incitement

Narratives of insecurity
Professor Abdelwahab El-Affendi has developed a theory that suggests lone wolf attacks and similar mass violence events occur as a result of "narratives of insecurity", where the aggressor(s) are motivated out of a sense of cataclysmic impending danger to their culture, race, religion, or way of life.

Scripted violence
The phrase "scripted violence" has been used in social science since at least 2002.

Author David Neiwert, who wrote the book Alt-America, notes:

Stochastic terrorism

Since 2018, the term "stochastic terrorism" has become a popular term used when discussing lone wolf attacks. While the exact definition has morphed over time, it has commonly come to refer to a concept whereby consistently demonizing or dehumanizing a targeted group or individual results in violence that is statistically likely, but cannot be easily accurately predicted.

The term was initially used to suggest that a quantifiable relationship may exist between seemingly random acts of terror and their intended goal of "perpetuating a reign of fear" via a manipulation of mass media and its capacity for "instant global news communication".  For example, careful timing and placement of just a few moderately explosive devices could have the same intended effect as numerous random attacks or the use of more powerful explosives if they were shrewdly devised to elicit the maximum response from media organizations. It was theorized by Gordon Woo in a 2002 paper that "the absolute number of attacks within a year, i.e. the rhythm of terror, might ultimately be determined as much by publicity goals and the political anniversary calendar as by the size of the terrorist ranks".

A variation of this stochastic terrorism model was later adapted by an anonymous blogger posting on Daily Kos in 2011 to describe public speech that can be expected to incite terrorism without a direct organizational link between the inciter and the perpetrator. The term "stochastic" is used in this instance to describe the random, probabilistic nature of its effect; whether or not an attack actually takes place. The stochastic terrorist in this context does not direct the actions of any particular individual or members of a group. Rather, the stochastic terrorist gives voice to a specific ideology via mass media with the aim of optimizing its dissemination.

It is in this manner that the stochastic terrorist is thought to randomly incite individuals predisposed to acts of violence. Because stochastic terrorists do not target and incite individual perpetrators of terror with their message, the perpetrator may be labeled a lone wolf by law enforcement, while the inciters avoid legal culpability and public scrutiny.

In their 2017 book Age of Lone Wolf Terrorism, criminologist Mark S. Hamm and sociologist Ramón Spaaij discuss stochastic terrorism as a form of "indirect enabling" of terrorists. They write that "stochastic terrorism is the method of international recruitment used by ISIS", and they refer to Anwar al-Awlaki and Alex Jones as stochastic terrorists.

Hamm and Spaaij discuss two instances of violence. In the 2010 Oakland freeway shootout, Byron Williams was said to be en route to offices of the American Civil Liberties Union and the Tides Foundation, planning to commit mass murder, "indirectly enabled by the conspiracy theories" of Glenn Beck and Alex Jones. As a left-wing example, they cite the 2012 shooting incident at the headquarters of the Family Research Council.

Some also describe the 2009 murder of George Tiller to be an example of stochastic terrorism, as many conservative news opinion shows and talk radio shows repeatedly demonized him for his administration of postviability abortions. For example, Fox News host Bill O'Reilly, during his evening opinion show The O'Reilly Factor referred to Dr. Tiller as "Tiller the Baby Killer" on various occasions.

In the wake of escalating attacks on the LGBT community in the early 2020s, including bomb threats on children's hospitals and the Colorado Springs nightclub shooting, right-wing activists such as Matt Walsh and Chaiya Raichik of Libs of TikTok have been accused of stochastic terrorism.

See also 

 List of lone wolf terrorist attacks
 Radicalization
 Sleeper cell
 Hate speech
 Psychohistory (fictional)
 Mens rea
 Clandestine cell system
 Leaderless resistance

References

External links 

 "Operation Lone Wolf" FBI
 Trends and Developments in Lone Wolf Terrorism in the Western World
 A Typology of Lone Wolves
 An Introduction to Terrorist Organisational Structures
 Lone-Wolf terrorism, a case study by the European research consortium Transnational Terrorism, Security and the Rule of Law
 'Lone Wolf' Attackers a New York Security Concern
 The Problem of the Lone-Wolf Terrorist
 Intelligence Reform and Terrorism Prevention Act of 2004: "Lone Wolf" Amendment to the Foreign Intelligence Surveillance Act

Further reading
 Mark Hamm and Ramon Spaaij, Age of Lone Wolf Terrorism (Columbia University Press, 2017) 
 Lone Wolves: How to Prevent this Phenomenon (International Centre for Counter-Terrorism - The Hague, 2014)
 
 Florian Hartleb: Lone Wolves: The New Terrorism of Right-Wing Single Actors. Springer VS, Wiesbaden 2020, S. 39–45

Terrorism by method
Terrorism tactics
Violent crime
War on terror
Metaphors referring to wolves